Fortis Films is an American film and television production company founded in 1995 by actress and producer Sandra Bullock. It is known for producing the films Hope Floats (1998), Miss Congeniality (2000), Two Weeks Notice (2002), Miss Congeniality 2: Armed and Fabulous (2005) and The Lost City (2022), and the television series George Lopez.

History

Fortis Films was founded in 1995 (and incorporated on April 16, 1996) in California, U.S. by American actress and producer Sandra Bullock. From 1995 to 2000, Bullock's sister, Gesine Bullock-Prado, was president of the company. The company is headquartered in Austin, Texas and West Hollywood, California.

In October 1997, the company signed a three year first-look deal with Warner Bros. Pictures from 1997 to 2000. In 1999, the company renewed it first-look deal with Warner Bros. In October 2003, the company signed a three-year extension of its first-look deal with Warner Bros.

Filmography

Film

Television

Notes

References

1995 establishments in California
Companies based in Austin, Texas
Companies based in West Hollywood, California
Mass media companies established in 1995
Film production companies of the United States
Television production companies of the United States